"Sentir" is a song recorded by Cuban recording artist Jon Secada for his debut self-titled studio album and for his debut Spanish-language album Otro Día Más Sin Verte (1992). It was released in 1993 as the fourth single from his Spanish-language album. The Spanish version peaked at number one on the US Billboard Hot Latin Tracks chart, making Secada the first Hispanic artist to do so. It was composed by Secada, Miguel Morejon, and Joseph Stefano, while Emilio Estefan Jr. produced the piece.

Production and success 
Jon Secada was the backup vocalist for Cuban singer Gloria Estefan in 1989. Secada became close friends with Gloria and her husband, Emilio Estefan Jr., who helped guide Secada into the music business. Secada released his self-titled debut album in 1992 with SBK Records. The recording made up of English-language compositions and two Spanish-language tracks. It was certified triple platinum by the Recording Industry Association of America (RIAA), denoting shipments of three million copies. Secada, with the help from Emilio, decided to release an all Spanish-language album. During the recording sessions, Secada confirmed that Gloria helped translate his English-language recordings into Spanish. He said that she told him to record songs that he would be comfortably fine with singing throughout his career as a singer. She also told them not to "translate everything literally" but to "keep the same theme of the song in play."

"Sentir" was released as the fourth single from his Spanish album. It peaked at number one on the US Billboard Hot Latin Tracks chart ending on July 3, 1993. Secada became the first Latin artist to place four number one singles from a single album on the US Billboard Hot Latin Tracks chart. Spanish Latin pop singer Enrique Iglesias broke Secada's record with five number one singles from his self-titled album in 1997. "Sentir" was the seventh best-performing Latin single on the Hot Latin Tracks year-end chart in 1993.

Chart performance

Weekly charts

Year-end charts

Credits and personnel 
Credits are taken from the album's liner notes.

Jon Secada — vocals, composer
Miguel Morejon — composer
Joseph Stefano — composer
Emilio Estefan Jr. — producer

References

Sources

1993 singles
1992 songs
Jon Secada songs
Spanish-language songs
Song recordings produced by Emilio Estefan
Songs written by Jon Secada
EMI Records singles
Songs written by Miguel A. Morejon